Oleg Vladimirovich Podruzhko (born 14 May 1964) is a former Russian football player.

His son Dmitri Podruzhko is a professional footballer.

References

1964 births
Living people
Soviet footballers
FC Dynamo Stavropol players
FC Chernomorets Novorossiysk players
FC Zhemchuzhina Sochi players
Russian footballers
Russian Premier League players
Russian expatriate footballers
Russian expatriate sportspeople in Malaysia
Expatriate footballers in Malaysia
FC Sheksna Cherepovets players
Association football defenders
FC Neftekhimik Nizhnekamsk players
FC Dynamo Vologda players
FC Bulat Cherepovets players